The 2017–18 OHL season was the 38th season of the Ontario Hockey League, in which twenty teams played 68 games each according to the regular season schedule, from September 21, 2017 to March 18, 2018. The Sault Ste. Marie Greyhounds accomplished a streak of 23 consecutive wins between October 27, 2017 and January 4, 2018.

The Hamilton Bulldogs won the J. Ross Robertson Cup as they defeated the Sault Ste. Marie Greyhounds in six games to represent the Ontario Hockey League at the 2018 Memorial Cup, which was hosted by the Regina Pats of the WHL at the Brandt Centre in Regina, Saskatchewan from May 18–27, 2018.

Regular season

Final standings
Note: DIV = Division; GP = Games played; W = Wins; L = Losses; OTL = Overtime losses; SL = Shootout losses; GF = Goals for; GA = Goals against; PTS = Points; x = clinched playoff berth; y = clinched division title; z = clinched conference title

Eastern conference

Western conference

Scoring leaders
Note: GP = Games played; G = Goals; A = Assists; Pts = Points; PIM = Penalty minutes

Leading goaltenders

Note: GP = Games played; Mins = Minutes played; W = Wins; L = Losses: OTL = Overtime losses; SL = Shootout losses; GA = Goals Allowed; SO = Shutouts; GAA = Goals against average

Playoffs

Conference quarterfinals

Eastern conference quarterfinals

(1) Hamilton Bulldogs vs. (8) Ottawa 67's

(2) Barrie Colts vs. (7) Mississauga Steelheads

(3) Kingston Frontenacs vs. (6) North Bay Battalion
 
*Note: Game 3 has been moved to Sudbury Community Arena, because the North Bay Memorial Gardens hasn't been ready in time after hosting the 2018 Ford World Women's Curling Championship.

(4) Niagara IceDogs vs. (5) Oshawa Generals

Western conference quarterfinals

(1) Sault Ste. Marie Greyhounds vs. (8) Saginaw Spirit

(2) Kitchener Rangers vs. (7) Guelph Storm

(3) Sarnia Sting vs. (6) Windsor Spitfires

(4) Owen Sound Attack vs. (5) London Knights

Conference semifinals

Eastern conference semifinals

(1) Hamilton Bulldogs vs. (4) Niagara IceDogs

(2) Barrie Colts vs. (3) Kingston Frontenacs

Western conference semifinals

(1) Sault Ste. Marie Greyhounds vs. (4) Owen Sound Attack

(2) Kitchener Rangers vs. (3) Sarnia Sting

Conference finals

Eastern conference finals

(1) Hamilton Bulldogs vs. (3) Kingston Frontenacs

Western conference finals

(1) Sault Ste. Marie Greyhounds vs. (2) Kitchener Rangers

J. Ross Robertson Cup

(W1) Sault Ste. Marie Greyhounds vs. (E1) Hamilton Bulldogs

J. Ross Robertson Cup Champions Roster

Playoff scoring leaders
Note: GP = Games played; G = Goals; A = Assists; Pts = Points; PIM = Penalty minutes

Playoff leading goaltenders

Note: GP = Games played; Mins = Minutes played; W = Wins; L = Losses: OTL = Overtime losses; SL = Shootout losses; GA = Goals Allowed; SO = Shutouts; GAA = Goals against average

Awards

All-Star teams
The OHL All-Star Teams were selected by the OHL's General Managers.

First team
Morgan Frost, Centre, Sault Ste. Marie Greyhounds
Boris Katchouk, Left Wing, Sault Ste. Marie Greyhounds
Jordan Kyrou, Right Wing, Sarnia Sting
Nicolas Hague, Defence, Mississauga Steelheads
Evan Bouchard, Defence, London Knights
Michael DiPietro, Goaltender, Windsor Spitfires
Drew Bannister, Coach, Sault Ste. Marie Greyhounds

Second team
Aaron Luchuk, Centre, Windsor Spitfires/Barrie Colts
Sam Miletic, Left Wing, London Knights/Niagara IceDogs
Taylor Raddysh, Right Wing, Sault Ste. Marie Greyhounds
Sean Durzi, Defence, Owen Sound Attack
Conor Timmins, Defence, Sault Ste. Marie Greyhounds
Jeremy Helvig, Goaltender, Kingston Frontenacs
Dale Hawerchuk, Coach, Barrie Colts

Third team
Gabriel Vilardi, Centre, Kingston Frontenacs
Adam Mascherin, Left Wing, Kitchener Rangers
Jason Robertson, Right Wing, Kingston Frontenacs
Cam Dineen, Defence, Sarnia Sting
Joey Keane, Defence, Barrie Colts
Matthew Villalta, Goaltender, Sault Ste. Marie Greyhounds
Trevor Letowski, Coach, Windsor Spitfires

2018 OHL Priority Selection
On April 7, 2018, the OHL conducted the 2018 Ontario Hockey League Priority Selection. The Sudbury Wolves held the first overall pick in the draft, and selected Quinton Byfield from the York-Simcoe Express of the OMHA. Byfield was awarded the Jack Ferguson Award, awarded to the top pick in the draft.

Below are the players who were selected in the first round of the 2018 Ontario Hockey League Priority Selection.

2018 NHL Entry Draft
On June 22-23, 2018, the National Hockey League conducted the 2018 NHL Entry Draft held at the American Airlines Center in Dallas, Texas. In total, 35 players from the Ontario Hockey League were selected in the draft. Andrei Svechnikov of the Barrie Colts was the first player from the OHL to be selected, as he was taken with the second overall pick by the Carolina Hurricanes.

Below are the players selected from OHL teams at the NHL Entry Draft.

2018 CHL Import Draft
On June 28, 2018, the Canadian Hockey League conducted the 2018 CHL Import Draft, in which teams in all three CHL leagues participate in. The Sudbury Wolves held the first pick in the draft by a team in the OHL, and selected Ukko-Pekka Luukkonen from Finland with their selection.

Below are the players who were selected in the first round by Ontario Hockey League teams in the 2018 CHL Import Draft.

References

External links
 www.ontariohockeyleague.com

Ontario Hockey League seasons
Ohl